Chetana ('Consciousness') was a Gujarati language monthly publication, issued as an organ of the Praja Socialist Party in Surat, India. The publication was established in 1954. It was printed at Arun Printing Press. Chetana had a circulation of 1,000.

Ishwarlal Desai was editor of Chetana, and Vasant Dalal the publisher.

References

1954 establishments in Bombay State
Defunct magazines published in India
Defunct political magazines
Gujarati-language magazines
Monthly magazines published in India
Political magazines published in India
Magazines established in 1954
Magazines with year of disestablishment missing
Socialist magazines